Hussein Abdul-Wahid  (born on 28 February 1985 in Baghdad, Iraq) is a former Iraqi football midfielder. He last played for Al-Shorta SC in Iraq where he was the club's captain.

Career
A defensive midfielder that was on the fringes of Yahya Alwan’s Olympic team a couple of years ago. He played for  Al-Sinaa and Zakho but finally made a name for himself at Al-Zawraa. Played for Erbil after spending the previous season with Duhok. He then moved to Al-Shorta in 2012. Hussein made his international Iraqi debut against Saudi Arabia and South Korea.

He won the Iraqi League title with Al-Shorta in 2013 and 2019, the latter as captain, and is joint third-most successful player in the league's history with six titles.

Honors

Clubs
Al-Zawraa
 Iraqi Premier League: 2005–06
 Iraqi Premier League: 2015–16
Erbil
 Iraqi Premier League: 2008–09
 Iraqi Premier League: 2011–12
Al-Shorta
 Iraqi Premier League: 2012–13
 Iraqi Premier League: 2018–19

References

External links

Goalzz.com

Sportspeople from Baghdad
Iraqi footballers
Iraq international footballers
Al-Zawraa SC players
Erbil SC players
1985 births
Living people
Al-Shorta SC players
Association football midfielders